The Master of the Pallant Altarpiece was a German painter, active in Cologne around 1430.  His work shows traces of the influence of Stefan Lochner.  His name is derived from an altarpiece, dated 1425, donated by Werner II of Pallant to the parish church of Linnich.

15th-century German painters
Pallant Altarpiece, Master of the